Novak Djokovic defeated Mardy Fish in the final, 6–2, 5–7, 6–3 to win the men's singles tennis title at the 2008 Indian Wells Masters.

Rafael Nadal was the defending champion, but lost in the semifinals to Djokovic.

Seeds
All seeds receive a bye into the second round.

Draw

Finals

Top half

Section 1

Section 2

Section 3

Section 4

Bottom half

Section 5

Section 6

Section 7

Section 8

Qualifying

Qualifying seeds

Qualifiers

Lucky losers

Qualifying draw

First qualifier

Second qualifier

Third qualifier

Fourth qualifier

Fifth qualifier

Sixth qualifier

Seventh qualifier

Eighth qualifier

Ninth qualifier

Tenth qualifier

Eleventh qualifier

Twelfth qualifier

References

External links
Draw
Qualifying Draw
ITF tournament profile

2008 Pacific Life Open
Pacific Life Open